Koen Metsemakers (born 30 April 1992) is a Dutch representative rower. He is an Olympian and an Olympic and world champion. His world championship title was in the men's quad scull won at the 2019 World Rowing Championships. In the Dutch men's quad scull at Tokyo 2020 he won an Olympic gold medal  and set a new world's best time for that event.

International representative rowing
Metsemakers Dutch representative debut came in 2016 when he raced in a double-scull at the World Rowing Cup III. The following year he secured a seat in the Dutch quad-scull and raced in that boat at all three World Rowing Cups, the European Championships and the 2017 World Rowing Championships in Sarasota, Florida where they finished in overall fourth place. He held that seat in 2018 again competing at three World Rowing Cups, the 2018 European Championships and the 2018 World Rowing Championships in Plovdiv.

In 2019 with Metsemakers at stroke and Stefan Broenink changed out for Tone Wieten, the Dutch quad continued to improve their rankings, winning gold at the European Championships, taking third place at the World Rowing Cup III and then at the 2019 World Rowing Championships in Linz-Ottensheim taking the gold medal ahead of Poland and winning a World Championship title. The crew stayed together with limited international racing in 2020 when they again won the European Championships.

They commenced their 2021 campaign for the delayed Tokyo Olympics with a second placing at the 2021 European Championships and a gold medal at the World Rowing Cup II in May 2021.

Personal
Metsemakers took up rowing at University. He completed a master's degree in Dentistry and then commenced medical studies.

References

External links
 
 
 

1992 births
Living people
Dutch male rowers
World Rowing Championships medalists for the Netherlands
European Rowing Championships medalists
Olympic rowers of the Netherlands
Rowers at the 2020 Summer Olympics
Olympic gold medalists for the Netherlands
Olympic medalists in rowing
Medalists at the 2020 Summer Olympics
20th-century Dutch people
21st-century Dutch people